Pete Sampras defeated Boris Becker in the final, 6–1, 6–2, 6–2 to win the men's singles tennis title at the 1994 Italian Open.

Jim Courier was the two-time defending champion, but was defeated in the quarterfinals by Sláva Doseděl.

Seeds

Draw

Finals

Section 1

Section 2

Section 3

Section 4

External links
 ATP Singles draw

Italian Open - Mens Singles, 1994
1994 Italian Open (tennis)